Erihapeti Rehu-Murchie  (30 December 1923 – 5 July 1997) was a Ngāi Tahu leader, health researcher, actor, composer and human rights commissioner. She was president of the Māori Women's Welfare League from 1977 to 1980 and research director from 1981 to 1985.

Personal life 
She was born at Arowhenua, on 30 December 1923. She studied at Arowhenua Native School, and Temuka District High School. From 1944 to 1945, she studied at Christchurch Teachers’ College where she met and married Malcolm McGregor Murchie, a pākeha with whom she went on to have ten children.

Work & Activism 
While working as a teacher she also acted and directed plays. She played Aroha Mataira in The Pohutukawa Tree by Bruce Mason.

Rehu-Murchie joined the Māori Women's Welfare League at a young age, and in the early 1970s supported the Māori Language Petition of her second cousin Hana Te Hemara. She also voiced the opposition of the league to All-Black tours to Apartheid South Africa.

In 1977 she became president of the league. In 1979 she publicly supported the student activism of Ngā Tamatoa in the controversy around the haka party incident and later opposed the 1981 Springbok Tour.

Following her three-year term as president, she became the league's research director from 1981 to 1985. During this time she wrote and directed a research initiative into the health of Māori women, eventually penning the landmark report Rapuora: Health and Māori Women.

In 1988, she was appointed to the Human Rights Commission. She travelled to indigenous meetings under the UN and was an early proponent of the United Nations Declaration on the Rights of Indigenous People. She died on 5 July 1997.

Honours
In the 1990 New Year Honours, Rehu-Murchie was appointed a Companion of the Queen's Service Order for community service. In 1990, she was conferred an honorary Doctor of Laws degree by Victoria University of Wellington, and in 1993 she was awarded the New Zealand Suffrage Centennial Medal. She was made a Companion of the New Zealand Order of Merit, for services to the community, in the 1997 Queen's Birthday Honours.

A fellowship in Māori health, awarded by the Health Research Council of New Zealand, is named in her honour.

References

External links 
 

1923 births
1997 deaths
Ngāi Tahu people
People from Temuka
University of Canterbury alumni
New Zealand Māori public servants
New Zealand Māori actresses
New Zealand theatre directors
Companions of the Queen's Service Order
Companions of the New Zealand Order of Merit
Recipients of the New Zealand Suffrage Centennial Medal 1993